The 2008 Tour de Wallonie was the 35th edition of the Tour de Wallonie cycle race and was held from 26 to 30 July 2008. The race started in Tubize and finished in Aubel. The race was won by Sergei Ivanov.

General classification

References

Tour de Wallonie
Tour de Wallonie
2008 UCI Europe Tour